Jean-Michel Lapin is a Haitian politician who served as acting Prime Minister of Haiti from 2019 to 2020.

Latin was appointed by President Jovenel Moïse on March 21, 2019.  He continued to serve despite his resignation on July 23, 2019, due to Parliament not confirming his appointment after four attempts at confirmation. Fritz William Michel was nominated to succeed him, but was not confirmed by parliament, and he was eventually succeeded by Joseph Jouthe.

Background 
He originally began working in government as a courier. He worked in the Ministry of Public Health and in the administration of the National Library of Haiti.

Before being appointed as Prime Minister, Lapin was serving as Culture and Communications Minister.

References 

Prime Ministers of Haiti
Government ministers of Haiti
Year of birth missing (living people)
Living people